Radical 159 or radical cart meaning "cart" or "car" is one of the 20 Kangxi radicals (214 radicals in total) composed of 7 strokes.

In the Kangxi Dictionary, there are 361 characters (out of 49,030) to be found under this radical.

Evolution

Derived characters

Literature

References

159
068